Jorge Eliécer Barón Ortíz (born Jorge Eliécer Varón Ortíz 29 June 1948 in Ibagué) is a Colombian television presenter, media personality and businessman.

Sources
  Jorge Barón Televisión Official Website
  Jorge Barón in ColArte
  Biography at the Ibagué City Hall website
  Sergio Cárdenas, El Espectador, 23 December 2006

1948 births
Free University of Colombia alumni
Television executives
Colombian television presenters
Living people